Edmond Alphonse Léon Buat (17 September 1868 – 30 December 1923) was a general in the French Army, who served as Chief of the Army Staff from 25 January 1920 until his death.

World War I 

In World War I, Buat commanded first the 121st Infantry division and then the 2nd Army Corps. In January 1917, he became the head of the General Reserve of the Artillery. From February 1918, he commanded successively the 33rd Infantry division, the 17th Army Corps and from 12 June, the 5th Army.

Chief of Staff 
Buat was appointed Chief of the Army Staff on 25 January 1920, and attended the first meeting of Conseil supérieur de la guerre following the armistice on 31 January. When asked by Alexandre Millerand whether the French Army had the capacity to occupy the Ruhr he replied that this would only be possible by mobilising the reserves.

Death 
He was buried in the Cemetery Miséricorde, Nantes. On 10 July 1927 Petain, Alexandre Millerand and Ragueneau attended the inauguration of a monument to Buat in Nantes.

Publications 
He wrote several books on military history specialising in artillery tactics:
 Un voyage d'état-major de corps d'armée, (with General Henri de Lacroix), Paris, R. Chapelot, 1908.
 Étude critique d'histoire militaire. 1809, de Ratisbonne à Znaïm, deux volumes, Paris, R. Chapelot, 1909, republished Paris, Teissèdre, 2008.
 L'Artillerie de campagne : son histoire, son évolution, son état actuel, Paris, Félix Alcan, coll. «Nouvelle collection scientifique», 1911. 
 Les Méthodes de tir de la batterie d'infanterie, M. Imhaus et R. Chapelot, 1911, new edition, 1912.
 Procédés de commandement du groupe de batteries sur le champ de bataille, Paris, R. Chapelot, 1912.
 La Lutte d'artillerie et les méthodes de tir de la contre-batterie, Paris, M. Imhaus et R. Chapelot, 1912.
 La Concentration allemande d'après un document trouvé dans un compartiment de chemin de fer, Paris, R. Chapelot, 1914 (published anonymously)
 L'Armée allemande pendant la guerre de 1914-1918, grandeur et décadence, manœuvres en lignes intérieures, Paris, Chapelot, 1920 (German translation: Die Deutsche Armee im Weltkriege, ihre Grösse und ihr Verfall, ihr Manöverieren auf der inneren Linie. Herausgegeben und übersetzt von Hans Krause, Munich, Wieland Verlag, 1921).
 Ludendorff, Paris, Chapelot, 1921.
 La Prise de Loivre par le 3e Battalion  du 133e (16 avril 1917), Paris, Chapelot, 1922.
 Hindenburg et Ludendorff stratèges, Paris, Berger-Levrault, 1923.
His journal, Journal du général Edmond Buat 1914-1923 was published posthumously by the French Ministry of Defense in 2015.

Promotions 
 April 14, 1916: Brigadier-General on a temporary basis
 December 29, 1916: Divisional General on a temporary basis
 December 31, 1916: Brigadier-General confirmed
 September 24, 1918: General of division confirmed

References

External link 
 Service records of General Buat

1868 births
1923 deaths
French generals
French military personnel of World War I
École Polytechnique alumni
Grand Croix of the Légion d'honneur
Recipients of the Croix de Guerre 1914–1918 (France)
Knights Commander of the Order of the Bath
Grand Officers of the Order of Saints Maurice and Lazarus
Officiers of the Ordre des Palmes Académiques
Recipients of the Croix de guerre (Belgium)